Peng Shuai was the defending champion, but chose not to participate.

Jelena Janković won the title by defeating Chang Kai-chen in the final, 6–3, 7–6(8–6).

Seeds

Main draw

Finals

Top half

Bottom half

References 
 Main draw
 Qualifying draw

Jiangxi International Women's Tennis Open - Singles
Jiangxi International Women's Tennis Open